Hypsiphrone is Codex XI, Tractate 4 of the Nag Hammadi writings,  named from the translation of a Greek feminine name word 'Hypsiphrone' or 'Hupsiph[rone]' rendered as she of high mind. The text is highly fragmentary, and only parts of several paragraphs have survived.

Summary 
The text describes a conversation between Hypsiphrone and her brethren Phainops. Hypsiphrone has returned to the world after being in the place of her virginity, and Phainops asks why she has left and suggests she follow him. Phainops then tells Hypsiphrone about a fount of blood that can be revealed by starting a fire.

References 
 

Religion in Egypt
Nag Hammadi library